Roam is the public transit system for the towns of Canmore, Banff (located inside Banff National Park), and Lake Louise (located inside Banff National Park) and  in the Bow Valley of Alberta's Rockies. The system is managed by the Bow Valley Regional Transit Services Commission (BVRTSC).

History 
Roam was formerly known as Banff Public Transit and the town has had some form of public transportation since 1994, contracted to a variety of private operators.

The system was re-branded as Roam in June 2008. At the same time a new fleet of four hybrid buses was acquired and operation of the service was turned over a new private contractor, Brewster Inc., a local tour bus company.

On April 21, 2011, the Bow Valley Regional Transit Services Commission (BVRTSC) was formed by the town of Banff, the town of Canmore and Improvement District No. 9. This new government agency was authorised to provide or coordinate local and regional transit services in the Bow Valley. Although not a voting member, Parks Canada actively participates in commission meetings.

In the fall of 2012 the BVRTSC took over responsibility for the transit service. On December 3, 2012, regional transit service between Banff and Canmore began.

Service 
There are currently six routes, four that operate year-round and two that operates seasonally (May to September). Service is provided using hybrid Nova buses, each decorated with scenes from the National Park, featuring either a grizzly bear, elk, mountain goat, moose, buffalo, fish, fox, lynx, or wolf.

References

External links 

 Bow Valley Regional Transit Services Commission – Five-Year Business Plan

Transit agencies in Alberta
Banff, Alberta